Garry Knox Bennett (October 8, 1934 – January 28, 2022) was an American woodworker, furniture maker, metalworker and artist from Alameda, California, who was known for his whimsical, inventive and unconventional uses of materials and designs in his work. His workshop and studio was in Oakland, California.

In popular culture
In a season 7 episode of the NBC show Parks and Recreation—the third, "William Henry Harrison"—Bennett is listed by main character Ron Swanson as one of only two celebrities that he recognizes. (The other being Magnus, a local bull elk.)

Bibliography
 Made in Oakland: The Furniture of Garry Knox Bennett, American Craft Museum, New York, 2001;  (catalogue for retrospective exhibition, curated by Ursula Ilse-Neuman)

References

External links
Made in Oakland: The Furniture of Garry Knox Bennett (Oakland Museum of California)
Garry Knox Bennett Furniture - Bennett's website
 An interview with Garry Knox Bennett, conducted 2002 February 1-2, by Glenn Adamson, for the Archives of American Art

1934 births
2022 deaths
American furniture designers
American sculptors
American woodworkers
California College of the Arts alumni
American furniture makers
Fellows of the American Craft Council
People from Alameda, California